Landelijk Noord is a neighborhood of Amsterdam, Netherlands.

Amsterdam-Noord
Neighbourhoods of Amsterdam